Onchon Air Base(온천비행장) is an air base near Onchon, Pyongan-namdo, North Korea.

Facilities 
The airfield has a single concrete runway 01/19 measuring 8150 x 170 feet (2484 x 52 m). It has a full-length parallel taxiway and several aprons and hangars.

Approximately  to the southeast of the air base is an underground aviation complex with runways extending outwards from the tunnel systems.

References 

Airports in North Korea
South Pyongan